1971 Hagihara, provisional designation , is an Eoan asteroid from the outer region of the asteroid belt, approximately 12 kilometers in diameter.

It was discovered on 14 September 1955, by the Indiana Asteroid Program at the Goethe Link Observatory near Brooklyn, Indiana, United States. It was later named after Japanese astronomer Yusuke Hagihara.

Orbit and classification 

Hagihara is a member of the Eos family, the largest asteroid family in the outer main belt consisting of nearly 10,000 asteroids. It orbits the Sun in the outer main-belt at a distance of 2.7–3.2 AU once every 5 years and 2 months (1,891 days). Its orbit has an eccentricity of 0.09 and an inclination of 9° with respect to the ecliptic. The asteroid's observation arc begins with its discovery observation at Goethe in September 1955.

Physical characteristics 

According to the survey carried out by NASA's Wide-field Infrared Survey Explorer with its subsequent NEOWISE mission, Hagihara measures 12.3 kilometers in diameter and its surface has an albedo of 0.135, which is neither typical for stony nor for carbonaceous bodies. As of 2017, the asteroid's composition and spectral type, as well as its rotation period and shape remain unknown.

Naming 

This minor planet was named in honour of Yusuke Hagihara (1897–1979) on the occasion of his 81st birthday. He was professor of astronomy at the University of Tokyo and director of the Tokyo Observatory. He also served as vice-president of the International Astronomical Union and was the president of its Commission VII.

Hagihara is best known for the discussion of stability problems in celestial mechanics and his theory of libratory motions, as well as for important contributions to the study of the velocity distribution of free electrons in planetary nebulae, and his important five-volume treatise on celestial mechanics. The official  was published by the Minor Planet Center on 1 August 1978.

References

External links 
 Asteroid Lightcurve Database (LCDB), query form (info )
 Dictionary of Minor Planet Names, Google books
 Asteroids and comets rotation curves, CdR – Observatoire de Genève, Raoul Behrend
 Discovery Circumstances: Numbered Minor Planets (1)-(5000) – Minor Planet Center
 
 

001971
001971
Named minor planets
19550914